Kamiz (also Romanized as Kamīz and Kemīz; also known as Kambīz and Kūmīz) is a village in Kah Rural District, Central District, Davarzan County, Razavi Khorasan Province, Iran. At the 2006 census, its population was 787, in 233 families.

References 

Populated places in Davarzan County